The Accra Declaration confirmed the support of the two main healthcare interoperability standards  by the open source community.  With the support of major open source advocates, this allowed free and unfettered access to the core healthcare interoperability standards which resulted in a substantial increase in their usage.  The International Healthcare Modelling Standards Development Organisation (IHMSDO) had earlier placed the intellectual property (IP) of the HL7 and DICOM standards and the IHE profiles into the public domain under the creative commons licence.

The declaration was signed at the May 2015 IHMSDO Standards and Implementation Meeting in Ghana.

References

External links
  International Healthcare Modelling Standards Development Organisation (IHMSDO)
 HL7.org site
 HL7 News
 Integrating the Healthcare Enterprise IHE
 DICOM
 FHIR
 FHIR News

Interoperability